is a compilation of the first 34 singles from the Japanese girl group Morning Musume, covering every A-side track from each of their singles since their major debut in 1997. It was released on October 24, 2007 in two editions; the normal edition contained only the two CDs, while the limited edition came with an alternative cover and a bonus DVD.

The cover of the regular edition is a recreation of the cover used for the single "Love Machine", and the limited edition cover is a recreation of the cover used for the single "Morning Coffee".

Track listing

Disc 1 
 
 
 
 
 
 
 
 
 
 I Wish
 
 
 
 
 Do It! Now

Disc 2 
 As for One Day

Limited edition DVD
"I Wish" —Yuko Nakazawa
From Morning Musume Concert Tour 2001 "Live Revolution 21 Spring"
"Do It! Now" —Kaori Iida
From Morning Musume Concert Tour 2004 Spring "The Best of Japan"
"Koko ni Iruzee!" —Natsumi Abe
From Morning Musume Concert Tour 2003 Spring "Non Stop!"
"As for One Day" —Kei Yasuda
From Morning Musume Concert Tour 2003 Spring "Non Stop!"
"Do It! Now" —Maki Goto
From Morning Musume Concert Tour 2002 Summer "Love is Alive!"
"The Peace!" —Rika Ishikawa
From Morning Musume Concert Tour 2002 Summer "Love is Alive!"
"Sōda! We're Alive" —Hitomi Yoshizawa
From Morning Musume Concert Tour 2002 Summer "Love is Alive!"
"Do It! Now" —Ai Takahashi
From Morning Musume Concert Tour 2002 Summer "Love is Alive!"
"Ambitious! Yashinteki de Ii Jan" —Asami Konno
From Hello! Project 2006 Summer: Wonderful Hearts Land
"Mr. Moonlight: Ai no Big Band" —Risa Niigaki
From Hello! Project 2002: Kotoshi mo Sugoi zo!"
"Do It! Now" —Eri Kamei
From Morning Musume Concert Tour 2003 Spring "Non Stop!"
"Aruiteru" —Sayumi Michishige
From Morning Musume Concert Tour 2006 Autumn: Odore! Morning Curry
"Shabondama" —Reina Tanaka
From Morning Musume Concert Tour "The Best of Japan Summer - Autumn '04"
"Iroppoi Jirettai" —Koharu Kusumi
From Morning Musume Concert Tour 2005 Summer Autumn "Baribari Kyōshitsu: Koharu-chan Irasshai!"
"Shabondama" —Aika Mitsui
From Morning Musume Concert Tour 2006 Autumn: Odore! Morning Curry
"Egao Yes Nude" —Junjun
From Morning Musume Concert Tour 2007 Spring: Sexy 8 Beat
"Onna ni Sachi Are" —Linlin
From Hello! Project 2007 Summer 10th Anniversary Daikansha-sai: Hello☆Pro Natsu Matsuri

Oricon rank and sales

References

External links 
Morning Musume All Singles Complete: 10th Anniversary entry at Up-Front Works official website

Morning Musume compilation albums
2007 video albums
Live video albums
2007 live albums
Zetima compilation albums
Zetima live albums
Zetima video albums
2007 greatest hits albums
Japanese-language compilation albums